New York’s 27th congressional district was a congressional district for the United States House of Representatives in western New York. It included all of Orleans, Genesee, Wyoming, and Livingston counties and parts of Erie, Monroe, Niagara, and Ontario counties. The district contained most of the eastern and southern suburbs of Buffalo, most of the southern suburbs of Rochester, as well as large rural areas to the east and south. The seat was last occupied by Republican Chris Jacobs, who won a special election on June 23, 2020. Previously, it had been vacant from October 1, 2019, when Republican incumbent Chris Collins resigned after pleading guilty to charges of insider trading.

It was the most Republican-leaning district in the state, with Donald Trump having won it by 24.5 points in 2016. It was also one of the most conservative districts in the Northeastern United States, leaning more Republican than any district in New England or New Jersey.

History 
The precursor to the district was the central Erie county seat numbered the 30th district in the 1990s. In the 1980s this area was in the 33rd district. In the 1970s it was numbered the 37th district, although certain suburban areas were in the 38th district (later the 31st). None of these districts included the Jamestown area, which had always been in the southern tier district (now the 29th district) in prior maps. The 27th district covered the area now in the 26th district in the 1990s and the Syracuse area (now the 25th district) in the 1980s. It was the Southern Tier seat now numbered the 22nd in the 1970s. In the 1960s this district was in the lower Hudson Valley covering the area now in the 19th district.

The district became obsolete following the 2020 United States census. Following the reapportionment process after the 2020 census, New York came just 89 people short of retaining its 27th congressional district. The 435th seat instead went to Minnesota. The district was eliminated after the 2022 midterm elections.

Voting

List of members representing the district

Election results
In New York State electoral politics there are numerous minor parties at various points on the political spectrum. Certain parties would invariably endorse either the Republican or Democratic candidate for every office, hence the state electoral results contain both the party votes, and the final candidate votes (listed as "Recap").

See also

 List of United States congressional districts
 New York's congressional districts
 United States congressional delegations from New York

References

 
 
 
 2004 House election data, Clerk of the United States House of Representatives
 2002 House election data, Clerk of the United States House of Representatives
 2000 House election data, Clerk of the United States House of Representatives
 1998 House election data, Clerk of the United States House of Representatives
 1996 House election data, Clerk of the United States House of Representatives

27
1823 establishments in New York (state)
Constituencies established in 1823
Constituencies disestablished in 2023
2023 disestablishments in New York (state)